Sandra Drabik (born 13 August 1988, in Kielce) is a Polish boxer. She won the silver medal in the women's 51 kg event at the 2015 European Games and one of the bronze medals in that event at the 2019 European Games.

In 2011, she won the silver medal at the 2011 Women's European Union Amateur Boxing Championships in the women's 54 kg event. A few months later she also won the silver medal in the 2011 Women's European Amateur Boxing Championships in the women's 54 kg event.

In 2016, she won one of the bronze medals in the women's 51 kg event at the 2016 Women's European Amateur Boxing Championships.

She competed in the women's flyweight event at the 2020 Summer Olympics held in Tokyo, Japan.

She is Jan Kochanowski University alumni.

References

External links 
 

Living people
1988 births
Polish women boxers
Boxers at the 2015 European Games
Boxers at the 2019 European Games
European Games medalists in boxing
European Games silver medalists for Poland
European Games bronze medalists for Poland
Sportspeople from Kielce
Bantamweight boxers
Flyweight boxers
Boxers at the 2020 Summer Olympics
Olympic boxers of Poland
21st-century Polish women